The Certification Authorities Software Team (CAST) is an international group of aviation certification and regulatory authority representatives. The organization of has been a means of coordination among representatives from certification authorities in North and South America, Europe, and Asia, in particular, the FAA and EASA. The focus of the organization has been harmonization of Certification Authorities activities in part though clarification and improvement of the guidance provided by DO-178() and DO-254().

Activities 
Since 1982, RTCA publication DO-178 has provided guidance on certification aspects of safety-critical software use in civil aircraft. In 1985, the first revision DO-178A was issued. The CAST organization first met November 1990 to develop consistent international certification authority input to the drafting of the next revision, DO-178B, which was released in 1992. In 2003, the organization expanded its scope to address the published certification guidance for airborne electronic hardware provided in the RTCA publication DO-254 released in 2000.

With application of DO-178B, it was discovered that many projects were not complying with DO-178B, but there was also wide variations in how various certification authorities conducted project assessments.  In response, the CAST developed a standard software compliance assessment approach. In a manner similar to standard staged engineering design review practices (e.g., 10%-50%-90%-100% Complete), this introduced four standard key points in a software development project where an FAA authority or representative would assess the applicant's progress towards compliance.  A goal was to detect issues in time to for the applicant to make adjustments to maximize successful accomplishment of all certification objectives. The FAA further developed this approach in the "Mega" FAA Order 8110.49 Chapter 2, defining the four Stages of Involvement (SOI) Audits as Planning, Development, Verification (Test), and Final.

From 1998 on, the CAST provided informational recommendations in the form of a series of position papers that were neither policy nor guidance documents. These position papers were among the inputs to the joint RTCA/EUROCAE committee that developed DO-178C, DO-278A, DO-248C, and DO-330, and the technology supplements to these publications (DO-331, DO-332, and DO-333).

The model for international certification authority harmonization has changed since CAST's inception. Certification Management Team Collaboration Strategy now emphasizes direct collaboration with industry on technical topics. CAST has not met since October 2016 and the FAA has removed links to past CAST position papers from its website; Position Papers 1-26 were archived in 2015 and this archive was removed in 2017. All but one remaining position papers were later removed from the website and the link to the remaining CAST-32A will be removed after publication of AC 20-193.

Even though these legacy items have been removed, not all information they contain has been included in replacement publications, so, they remain a source of insight into present guidance.

Position Papers

References

External links 
 . Retrieved 2021-11-02.
 . Retrieved 2022-08-19.
 . Retrieved 2022-08-19.

Avionics
Safety
Software requirements
RTCA standards
Computer standards